A number of steamships were named Glanrhyd, including:

, a collier in service 1924–38
, a collier in service 1946–48

Ship names